Guy Schrans (Ghent 25 November 1937 – 27 March 2018) was an emeritus Professor at Ghent University (Ghent, Belgium), liberal politician and lawyer at the Brussels bar. 

He was assessor in the department legislation of the Council of State. In addition he was a member of Committee of Directors of the Belgian Protection fund of deposits and financial instruments. He was a member of the Coudenberg group a Belgian federalist think tank.

Bibliography
 Guy Schrans, Vrijmetselaars te Gent in de XVIIIde eeuw, Liberaal Archief, 1997
 Guy Schrans and Ben De Poorter, Telecommunicatie en het Internet: de Gewijzigde Grenzen van het Recht, Mys & Breesch, 2001
 Guy Schrans and Reinhard Steennot, Algemeen deel Financieel recht, Reeks Instituut Financieel Recht, nr. 5, Intersentia, Sept. 2003

References

Sources
 Guy Schrans (Dutch)
 Guy Schrans (Moniteur Belge)

1937 births
2018 deaths
Belgian academics
Belgian jurists
Academic staff of Ghent University
Jurists from Ghent